is a feminine Japanese given name which can also be used as a surname.

Possible writings
Yui can be written using different kanji characters and can mean:
 唯, "only, alone, sole"
 由, "reason"
 維, "supportive"
 惟, "think, consider, reflect"
 結, "tie/link"
 唯衣, "only, robe/clothing"
 由衣, "reason, robe/clothing"
 結衣, "tie/link, robe/clothing"

The given name can also be written in hiragana or katakana.

As a surname
 由井, "reason, well"
 油井, "oil well"
 由比, "reason, compare"

People
 With the given name Yui
 Yui (singer) (born 1987), Japanese pop/rock artist
 Yui Aragaki (新垣 結衣, born 1988), Japanese singer, actress and voice actress
 Yui Asaka (浅香 唯, born 1969), Japanese singer and actress
 , Japanese women's footballer
 Yui Horie (堀江 由衣, born 1976), Japanese singer and voice actress
 Yui Ichikawa (市川 由衣, born 1986), Japanese actress and singer
 , Japanese actress and model
 , Japanese field hockey player
 Yui Ishikawa (石川 由依, born 1989), Japanese voice actress
 Yui Kamiji (上地 結衣, born 1994), Japanese wheelchair tennis player
 Yui Kanno (結以, born 1987), Japanese model
 , Japanese singer and model
 Yui Koike (小池 唯, born 1991), Japanese gravure idol and actress
 Yui Makino (牧野由依, born 1986), Japanese voice actress
 Yui Mizuno (水野 由結, born 1999), also known as YUIMETAL, Japanese idol, singer and model
 Yui Natsukawa (夏川 結衣, born 1968), Japanese actress
 Yui Nītsu (由衣), a member of the former duo J-pop band Rythem
 , Japanese swimmer
 Yui Okada (岡田 唯, born 1987), member of the J-pop idol group v-u-den
 , Japanese handball player
 , Japanese long-distance runner
 , Japanese swimmer

With the surname Yui
 Kimiya Yui (油井 亀美也, born 1970), Japanese astronaut
 , Japanese hurdler
 Noriko Yui, Japanese-Canadian professor of mathematics
 Yui Shōsetsu (由井 正雪, 1605–1651), Japanese military strategist
 Toshiki Yui (唯 登詩樹, born 1956), Japanese manga artist

Fictional characters

With the given name Yui 
 Yui Furukawa (古川 ゆい), a character in the anime and manga series Ushinawareta Mirai o Motomete
 Yui Hirasawa (平澤 唯), a character in the anime and manga series K-On!
 Yui Hongo (唯), a character in Fushigi Yûgi
 Ichii Yui (櫟井 唯), one of the main characters in the anime and manga Yuyushiki
 Yui Ikari (碇 ユイ), a character in Neon Genesis Evangelion
 Yui Inaba (結衣), a character in the visual novel Flyable Heart
 Yui Kasuga (春日結), the main character in Corrector Yui
 Yui Kimura, a survivor in Dead by Daylight
 Yui Kiriyama (桐山 唯), one of the main characters in the novel, manga and anime series Kokoro Connect
 Yui Komori (ユイ), the main character in Diabolik Lovers
 Yui Kotegawa (唯), a character in To Love-Ru
 Yui Mamiya, a minor character in Lost Judgment
 Yui-MHCP001, a character in the anime and manga series Sword Art Online
 Yui Minamito (南戸 唯), a character in Strawberry 100%
 Yui Nanase (七瀬 ゆい), a supporting character in Go! Princess PreCure
 Yui Narumi (ゆい), a character in the Lucky Star series
 Yui Tabata (田端 ゆい), a character in H2O: Footprints in the Sand
 Yui Takamura, a character in Muv-Luv Alternative: Total Eclipse
 Yui Funami (船見 結衣), one of the main characters in an anime and manga series  Yuru Yuri / Yuru Yuri ♪♪
 Yui (ゆい), the protagonist in Indian Summer manga
 Yui (ユイ), a character in Angel Beats
 Yui Samidare (五月雨 結), the main character in Danganronpa Kirigiri
 Yui Kusanagi (草薙　結衣)  the lead character in Kamigami no Asobi
 Yui Yuigahama, a character in My Teen Romantic Comedy SNAFU
 Yui Michimiya, a character in Haikyu!!
 Yui Rio, a character in the video game Yandere Simulator
 Yui Komori, main protagonist in Diabolik Lovers
 Yui, daughter of Kirito And Asuna in Sword Art Online
 Yui Shishido, character in the Corpse Party series
 Fai D. Flowright, also known as Yūi (ユゥイ), a character in Tsubasa: Reservoir Chronicle
 Yui Nagomi (和実ゆい), one of the characters in Delicious Party Pretty Cure

With the surname Yui 
 Meroko Yui (めろこ・ユイ), a character in Full Moon o Sagashite
 Heero Yuy (ヒイロ・ユイ), the lead character in Mobile Suit Gundam Wing
 Yui Kodai a character in the Boku No Hero Academia and a student in class 1B.
 Tsuruno Yui (由比鶴乃), a main character in the Puella Magi Madoka Magica spinoff Magia Record

See also 
 Yui (disambiguation)

Japanese feminine given names
Japanese-language surnames